Sébastien Lareau and Alex O'Brien were the defending champions but they competed with different partners that year, Lareau with Daniel Nestor and O'Brien with Jared Palmer.

O'Brien and Palmer lost in the second round to Jonathan Stark and Eric Taino.

Lareau and Nestor lost in the semifinals to Todd Woodbridge and Mark Woodforde.

Woodbridge and Woodforde won in the final 6–7(5–7), 6–3, 7–6(7–1) against Stark and Taino.

Seeds
The top four seeded teams received byes into the second round.

Draw

Finals

Top half

Bottom half

External links
 2000 Stella Artois Championships Doubles Draw

Doubles